Temples in Flames Tour was a concert tour by Bob Dylan. He was supported on the tour by Tom Petty and the Heartbreakers. The tour started with two concerts in Israel and covered various European countries, culminating in four concerts at Wembley Arena in London, England.

Roger McGuinn was the opening act for this tour (who was also supported by Tom Petty and the Heartbreakers).

This was the last time that Dylan toured with Tom Petty and the last tour before beginning the Never Ending Tour. Dylan and Petty briefly united in Holmdel, New Jersey in the summer of 2003.

Tour dates

References

External links
BobLinks – Comprehensive log of concerts and set lists
Bjorner's Still on the Road – Information on recording sessions and performances

Bob Dylan concert tours
1987 concert tours